Klebsiella michiganensis is a species of bacteria in the genus Klebsiella and is one of the nine species in the Klebsiella oxytoca complex. It is closely related to the species K. oxytoca except K. michiganensis is negative in the pectin degradation test and negative by PCR for polygalacturonase gene pehX. The name K. michiganensis comes from the United States' state of Michigan, where the species was originally isolated from a toothbrush holder.

References 

Bacteria described in 2013
Enterobacteriaceae